Villa del Parque is a barrio (neighbourhood) or district within the city of Buenos Aires, Argentina. Its name translates as Village of the Park and was derived from its earliest beginnings, when several haciendas were all that existed, alongside a growing agricultural park in this section of Buenos Aires Province.

History
Villa del Parque was officially incorporated on 8 November 1908, as a separate district of the city of Buenos Aires. This neighborhood and Villa Devoto, both got their start when an initiative to improve the teaching of agronomy during the presidency of Julio Roca was begun in 1901. Upon the establishment of a field station and model farm in 1903, population and developmental growth resulted in its expansion towards this agronomy park and the eventual opening of a railway station in August 1907.

External links

 Barrio Villa del Parque (gobBsAs)
 VilladelParque.com
 VilladelParqueInfo.com.ar
 Barriada.com.ar
 Centenary Commission

Neighbourhoods of Buenos Aires